William Halsey (1770 – August 16, 1843) was the first Mayor of Newark, New Jersey serving from 1836 to 1837. He was 66 years of age and an attorney when elected. Halsey Street in downtown Newark is named after him. He also served as director of the Newark Aqueduct Company.

Footnotes

External links
http://www.sbhcs.com/hospitals/nbicentrev/history/1900.html

Mayors of Newark, New Jersey
1770 births
1843 deaths
People from Millburn, New Jersey